Frankie (Italian Roulette)  is a short film written and directed by Francesco Mazza, who also acts as the main character.

It depicts the story of Italian immigrant Frankie Tramonto, struggling to survive in modern New York City among improbable dates, typical Italian food and a shady immigration lawyer who forces him to confront with a dark choice in order to stay in the U.S.

The co-writer of Frankie is New York-based director Amos Poe.

Awards and Nomination 
Nominated "Best Short" at Nastro D'Argento 2016 (cinquina finalista) (Rome, Italy)
Winner "Best Short" at Oaxaca Film Fest in 2015 (Oaxaca, Mexico)
Winner "Audience Award" at Short Cut Film Festival in 2015 (Chicago, USA)
Official selection at DC Short Film Festival  (Washington DC, USA)
Official selection at Big Apple Film Festival in 2015 (New York, USA)
Official selection at Lone Star Film Festival in 2015 (Fort Worth, USA)
Official selection at Crossroads Film Festival in 2016 (Jackson, USA)
Official selection at New York Independent Film Festival  in 2016 (New York, USA)
Official selection at Big Island Film Festival in 2016 (Hawaii, USA)
Official selection at Arlington International Film Festival in 2016
Official selection at Long Island Film Festival in 2016
Official selection for the Short Film Day 2015 at Centro Internazionale del Corto

References

2015 short films
Italian short films